Shiomizaka (潮見坂) is a slope in Mita 4-chome located at Tsuki no Misaki, Tokyo. It intersects Hijirizaka, which runs southwest from the head of the promontory. In the Edo period, one could look out from the slope and see Tokyo Bay. This caused the slope to become a well-known scene of Edo-era Japan. It is often used in ukiyo-e prints. Many hill roads in Japan bear the name "Shiomizaka". The name carries a dual meaning in Japanese; the most common is one is "watch the tide" and another is "see death." (Similar dual meanings occur in Japanese, for example Fujimi has two meaning, one is "look at Mount Fuji," another is "become immortal.") The names of the roads are attributed to Edo Shogunate founder Tokugawa Ieyasu who was given the territory by Toyotomi Hideyoshi. It is said that he gave the slopes the names "shiomi" and "fujimi" because had faced the many crisis and overcame it in his life, that is Shi wo mite, and Fujimi ni naru.

Geography of Minato, Tokyo